The Monitors is a 1969 U.S. satirical science fiction film. Shot in Chicago, it was the first film production of the city's Second City comedy troupe and was coproduced and financed by the Bell and Howell film-equipment manufacturing company (then based in nearby Skokie) in an effort to establish Chicago as a film production center. It is based on the 1966 novel of the same name by Keith Laumer.

Plot
Earth has been taken over by a benign group of aliens known as the Monitors, gentlemanly figures clad in black overcoats and bowler hats. They are dedicated to suppressing humanity's propensities for violence, sex, war, and trouble, enforcing their ethos with spray cans of a pacifying gas and with television ads praising the Monitors' rule—the latter featuring cameos by a variety of comedic actors, as well as bandleader Xavier Cugat and Illinois senator Everett Dirksen (who died before the film's release).

A conflict with the Monitors, inspired by the outrageous antics of a street preacher (Larry Storch), leads to the flight of movie actress Barbara (Susan Oliver), who is a collaborator with the Monitors, along with free-lance pilot Harry (Guy Stockwell) and Harry's brother Max (Avery Schreiber), and their spiriting away by the "preacher", who turns out to be a leader of SCRAG or "Secret Counter Retaliatorial Group", an anti-Monitor resistance group. After a series of vicissitudes, with Harry among the Monitors and Barbara and Max among the SCRAG forces, the principals are reunited and, minus Barbara, fly off to Washington, D.C., in an attempt to foil a SCRAG plot to bomb Monitor headquarters.

The Monitors, who have been aware of all these events, have decided that human beings are not worthy of their leadership, and they depart. Humanity is free to return to its violent and corrupt ways.

Cast
 Guy Stockwell as Harry
 Susan Oliver as Barbara
 Avery Schreiber as Max
 Sherry Jackson as Mona
 Shepperd Strudwick as Tersh Jeterax (Monitor leader)
 Keenan Wynn as The General
 Ed Begley as The President
 Larry Storch as Colonel Stutz
 Adam Arkin – cameo
 Alan Arkin – cameo
 Xavier Cugat – cameo
 Barbara Dana – cameo
 Everett Dirksen – cameo
 Stubby Kaye – cameo
 Jackie Vernon – cameo

Main characters
Harry Jordan (Guy Stockwell) – Harry had been a top gun in the U.S. Air Force in the world war that resulted in the Monitors' taking essential control of the Earth to prevent its complete destruction. (He had "14 confirmed kills", a character says; five kills make a pilot an ace.)  This war record makes him known to both the president of the United States and to the Monitors.  However, as the film begins, Harry has had a series of failed jobs and is struggling to adjust to life under the Monitors. He resents what he considers to be their illegitimate authority and interferes in the Monitors' police action to quell a public disturbance. Shortly afterward, however, Harry saves the life of a Monitor, even though doing so results in his being captured for his role in the riot. Even though he works to overthrow the Monitors, he also comes to oppose SCRAG, the right-wing "citizen's army" that wants to impose its own version of American government. Although SCRAG operatives free Harry from his captivity, he is reluctant to use their "implosion bomb" against the Monitors. After Harry learns that he cannot disable the timing mechanism of the weapon, he impulsively decides to try to use it in an attempt to coerce the Monitors into leaving Earth. The implacable refusal of the Monitors to leave by force ultimately causes Harry to respect their efforts to bring peace to warlike Earth.

Barbara Cole (Susan Oliver) – Barbara is a famous actress who idealistically admires the efforts of the Monitors to eliminate conflicts and improve social conditions. ("Everyone has to choose," she says. "Peace or war, wealth or poverty.")  Instead of challenging or resenting Monitor authority, Barbara supports it. When she meets a Monitor, she nods her head deferentially, and she refers to the Monitor leader as "Sir", telling him, "I believe in what you're doing."  Barbara's meeting with the Monitors' leader becomes a confessional, in which she agrees to "recruit" Harry (a stunt pilot in the production of her film) to the Monitors' side. Although to the very end Barbara wants no harm to come to the Monitors, she eventually becomes conflicted and disillusioned by their difficulty in understanding complex human emotions like love.

Max Jordan (Avery Schreiber) – Although Max teases Harry about getting fired from the film production, it appears that Max has not done all that well with his life either. Early on, he unsuccessfully attempts to pressure Barbara to arrange a musical audition for him.  Later, after SCRAG rescues Max and Harry from the riot, Max also proves to be a failure at the military training that SCRAG forces upon him. However, Max grows in maturity and courage as he works to free his brother from the Monitors, and he combines with Harry to oppose both the Monitors and SCRAG.

Mona (Sherry Jackson) – Along with Harry, Mona is an unwilling student at the Monitors re-education "school". She becomes attracted to Harry and agrees to help him escape from the hands of his captors. For a while, Mona is part of a love triangle with Harry and Barbara. Ultimately she becomes involved with Max and leaves with him at the story's end.

Tersh Jeterax (Sheppard Strudwick) – The leader of the Monitors' efforts in Chicago, Jeterax is wholly dedicated to their cause of peace and social justice. He also serves as a wise counselor to Barbara, even though by the story's end he finally admits he cannot understand the subtleties of human emotions. During the highly dramatic scene in which Jeterax confronts Harry in the "Peace Room" of the Monitors' headquarters, Jeterax initially berates America as "your blighted country" with "corrupt politicians" and "inefficient and unjust police". He then shows Harry a Monitors' propaganda video that lays bare the ills that beset the pre-world war United States: racism, police brutality, pollution, escapism, and imperialism among them. Jeterax incorrectly believes that Harry will learn to support the Monitors as he sends him off to his re-education. Through the Monitors' superior surveillance systems, however, he watches and slowly realizes that the Monitors' control, both worldwide and in Chicago, is coming apart. When Harry returns to the Peace Room, Jeterax tells him he will "never by force" leave Earth or his mission. Instead, Jeterax states, the Monitors are choosing to leave Earth willingly rather than exert brute physical force to control the world.

Gen. Blackwish (Keenan Wynn) – The leader of SCRAG, the general has a compound just outside Chicago from which he plans to destroy the local headquarters of the Monitors with the implosion bomb "and threaten the rest". Eventually, though, he loses control of both his citizen's army and the bomb. After the Monitors have left Earth, however, the general becomes a top military leader when the president regains power over the United States.

The President (Ed Begley) – After the Monitors gained control of the United States, the president has little to do but sit in the White House, completing crossword puzzles. He welcomes Harry, Max, and Mona to the Oval Office after they escape from the Monitors and SCRAG. The president confirms that he no longer has any power but stays in office expecting that a grassroots uprising will overthrow the Monitors. The President explains that he learned through life that the people will only accept good if it is done by themselves, and not by others. "I'd stake my life on it," he assures Harry.

Col. Stutz (Larry Storch) – Formerly a feed salesman, the colonel is now the right-hand man to Gen. Blackwish. Initially, he is fearless and decisive, as he instigates the riot and spirits away Harry, Max, and Barbara after the Monitors arrive. Later, he and Max provide the getaway when Harry and Mona are rescued. However, Col. Stutz ultimately proves to be disloyal to the general, plotting to take over SCRAG and "the rattler"—i.e., the implosion bomb. Nonetheless, he and the general reunite as top military brass when the president regains power, with Stutz dressed as General Douglas MacArthur. Col. Stutz and Max provide much of the comic relief in the story.

Release
The film was due to open November 12, 1969, but was brought forward a month due to the poor performance of another film and opened in more than 30 theaters in the New York area on October 8, 1969.

Reception
In his review of The Monitors, The New York Times reviewer Howard Thompson remarked that the film "clips along with considerable verve" but that the "endless wisecracks seem none too wise or witty, or, for that matter, new". The entry on the film in The Encyclopedia of Science Fiction, on the other hand, calls it "an oddity, which flopped badly". A TV Guide review notes that it is "full of funny skits" but concludes, "As a whole, however, this is a disappointing film."

The film scholar Vivian Sobchack has noted that the "short and simple jingle dealing with the Monitors and their ability to bring happiness" used recurrently in the film serves to spoof "the incantations and sacred songs attendent  to the selling of material goods and politicians".

The film grossed a disappointing $50,000 in its first week from 24 theaters in New York on a double bill with (A Session with) The Committee.

See also
 List of American films of 1969

References

External links
 
 
 

1969 films
1960s English-language films
American science fiction films
1960s science fiction films
Films shot in Chicago
Films based on American novels
1960s American films